Achayans is a 2017 Indian Malayalam-language comedy crime thriller film directed by Kannan Thamarakkulam and written by Sethu. Starring Jayaram, Unni Mukundan, Prakash Raj, Amala Paul, Sanju Sivram, Adil Ibrahim, Sshivada, Anu Sithara. Principal photography began in November 2016, with shooting locations being Edakochi and Vagamon. The film was released in India on may 2017 with mixed-to-positive reviews & and was an Hit at box office.
The film was later dubbed into Telugu as Marana Mrudangam.

Synopsis
Four brothers - Roy, Tony, Rafi, and Aby - get drunk on the night before Tony's wedding. Their family members send them to a Christian de-addiction centre, but they are kicked out. When they decide to start a road trip, they are accompanied by two women, Reetha and Prayaga, who have escaped from a critical situation. When they reach a hotel on New Year's Eve 2017, they sleep late after the celebration. On the next day Reetha is found dead. Finding the culprit and the reason behind her death is the main plot of the film.

Cast 

Jayaram as Roy Thottathil
Unni Mukundan as Tony Vavachan
Prakash Raj as Commissioner Karthik Kathiresan IPS
Amala Paul as Reetha Fernandez
Anu Sithara as Prayaga
Akshara Kishor as Young Prayaga
Sanju Sivram as Rafi
Adil Ibrahim as Aby
Sshivada as Jessica
Siddique as Fernandez, Reetha's father
Anju Aravind as Aleena, Reetha's mother
Janardhanan as Varkey Vavachan, Tony's father
Ponnamma Babu as Aleyamma Vavachan, Tony's mother
Kumarakam Raghunath as Aravindan, Prayaga's father
Nitha Promy as Prayaga's mother
Jayan Cherthala as George, Jessica's father
Usha as Jessica's mother
Maniyanpilla Raju as CI Iqbal
Kaviyoor Ponnamma as Roy's mother
Suja Varunee as SI Panchami
Shanu Suresh
Idavela Babu as Sugathan
Dharmajan Bolgatty as Sudharman
Ramesh Pisharody as Father Jose Keerikkadan
Kalabhavan Navas as Jose Keerikkadan's assistant
Saju Navodaya as SI Nalinikanth
Jayakrishnan as Police Officer
Sohan Seenulal as Lakshmana
Thesni Khan as Valsa
Krishna as Craig
 Rajavarman Ramakrishnan as Tony's driver
Sajan Palluruthy as Alcohol addict
Jaise Jose as Goon
Sruthi Ramakrishnan as Geetha
Maya Viswanath
P. C. George as himself (cameo appearance)

Production
The venture began production in November 2016. Achayans marked third collaboration for the duo after Aadupuliyattam.

Release

Theatrical
Achayans was opened in over 1000 screens in India, released alongside Godha and Adventures of Omanakuttan on 19 May 2017.

Reception

Critical response
Indiaglitz rated 3/5 and said that "Achayans needs to have been reworked in a different way. A more sharper script would have made it more entertaining". Deccan Chronicle stated that the movie is a one time watch and rated 3.5/5. The Times of India rated the movie 3.5/5 and said that "Overall, Achayans is a film that requires some patience to watch and doesn't quite qualify as an entertainer".

Box office
Though the critic reviews were unfavourable, the film managed to be one of the profitable ventures of 2017. The film made on a budget of  ~6 crore and  collected above 17.5 crore worldwide.

References

External links
 

2010s Malayalam-language films
2017 films
Indian comedy thriller films
2010s comedy thriller films
Films directed by Kannan Thamarakkulam
2017 comedy films